Cannington is an electoral district of the Legislative Assembly in the Australian state of Western Australia.

The district is based in the inner southern suburbs of Perth.

Cannington is a safe Labor seat. Based on the results of the 2005 state election, the district was created with a Labor Party majority of 63.3% to 36.7% versus the Liberal Party.

Geography
Based in the southern suburbs of Perth, the district straddles both sides of the Canning River. It includes most of Cannington, as well as East Cannington, Beckenham, Queens Park, Wilson, Lynwood, Langford, most of Ferndale and part of Thornlie.

History
Cannington was first contested at the 2008 state election. It was a new seat created as a result of the one vote one value reforms. Its territory north of the Canning River was constructed from parts of Victoria Park and Kenwick, whilst territory south of the Canning River came from Riverton and Southern River.

Members for Cannington

Election results

References

External links
 
 

Electoral districts of Western Australia